Linares is one of five parishes (administrative divisions) in San Martín del Rey Aurelio, a municipality within the province and autonomous community of Asturias, in northern Spain.

Villages and hamlets

Parishes in San Martín del Rey Aurelio